The Museum Jorge Rando is the first expressionist museum in Málaga, Andalusia, Spain. Dedicated to the painter Jorge Rando, it collects his works and it temporally hosts the works of other national and international artists belonging to this movement. It was officially inaugurated on May 28, 2015.

The Museum 
The mission of the museum is centered first of all on the study and the diffusion of the Jorge Rando work, as well as on the investigation about poetics of Expressionism, a movement which started at the end of the 19th century and is still pretty active in our times, and thanks to it some of the most fecund contributions to the contemporary western culture, in the wider sense, originated. The study and the representation of the different artistic facets, such as painting, sculpture, architecture, philosophy, literature, cinema, and music, are included among its priorities.

It is a museum which is meant to be the reflection of Jorge Rando's work, originating a cultural philosophy homologated to his thinking. Moved by the motto "Doors are always open… so that people can go inside and the museum goes outside", it has become a museum which looks at the Arts under a spiritual and humanistic perspective.

Entrance and guided tours assistance are all free.

Exhibitions

Jorge Rando Work 
The rooms host Jorge Rando's artistic production, with an expositive discourse on the move, characterized by the interchange of the artist’s different themed cycles, in order to accompany the artwork of the invited artists.

Temporary Exhibitions 

The temporary exhibitions embrace national and international artists bound to expressionism or neo-expressionism. During its first year it held an exhibition of the drawings of the artist Käthe Kollwitz and on the 14th of the following December there will be inaugurated the first magna exhibition in Spain of the sculptor Ernst Barlach.

La Sala de Estar del Arte 

The museum is meant to be the Living Room of Art (La Sala de Estar del Arte). All throughoutthe year it embraces representations of different artistic disciplines.
El color del sonido (The color of the sound) is the cycle dedicated to music; Luces y sombras (Lights and Shadows) is the film screening and discussion cycle, with introduction and a debate at the end; El Gabinet is the cycle dedicated to literature, theatre, and narrative; Arte (Art) is the cycle dedicated to art discussions and Reports, and artistic meetings, while Lo que está pasando (What is going on) is the cycle dedicated to the debate about different themes and issues, coordinated by the UNESCO chair of Communication of Málaga University.

Visits and education 

The museum offers Guided tours, that need neither to be booked nor a minimum number of participants. They are discussions offered by Art Historians, in which prefixed guidelines do not exist: they are meant to be an exchange of impressions related to the visitant requests and the necessities, so that every visit turns into a discovery and a mutual enrichment.

Also personalized tours can be arranged, for groups that have special necessities. There is a program aimed to let expressionism, neo-expressionism, and the contemporary art in general become closer to students, thanks to guided tours, artistic workshops, and debate meetings.

The Building 

The Museum Jorge Rando is an integral part of the Las Mercedarias monastery, in via Cruz del Molinillo, Málaga. It was built on the drawings of the architect D. Manuel Rivera Valentín (1878) and it is considered an emblematic building, mainly of artistic interest. A magnificent specimen of mandarin orange tree stands out in the posterior inner yard of the monastery: more than 140 years ago it was planted by the founder of the monastery.

The adjustment works made to a part of the monastery, in order to turn it into the museum, were started in 2011 by the City Council of Málaga and they finished during the Spring 2014, under the direction of the architect D. José Antonio González Vargas. The strength of expressionist art could not have found a better place than one that preserves such a spiritual implication.

Installations 

The Museum Jorge Rando has combined in its construction the old side of the courtyard with the new installation in béton brut (raw concrete) and Weathering steel. A synergy that combines the spirituality and quietness of the monastery with the strength of the Expressionist art.

It has four exposition rooms illuminated by natural light: this is one of the most relevant points of the construction.
Moreover, in the museum there are other spaces like the library, the inner yard and the workshop, which is the space dedicated to the creation of Paintings. A group of artists usually make regular use of it, making it a meeting point where the dialogue between artists, Historians, and visitors is always open, allowing the continuous exchange of opinions and the debate about Art and culture.

Administration
The direction, administration and all the activities of the museum, such as the exhibition, the cycles of debate related to art and the aesthetics of expressionism, the workshops, and seminars, etc., will be under the direction of the Jorge Rando Foundation.

References

External links

 Museum Jorge Rando Página oficial Museum Jorge Rando.
 Publicación Diario Sur El Museum Jorge Rando abre el telón.
 Publicación periódico el Mundo Itinerarios por el expressionismo.
 Publicación la Opinión El Museum Jorge Rando ya es una realidad.
 Publicación la Vanguardia Un centenar de obras de pintura y escultura inauguran el Museo Jorge Rando en la capital.
 Agencia EFE Jorge Rando abre su museo como "sala de estar" consagrada al expressionismo.
Agencia Europapress Un centenar de obras de pintura y escultura inauguran el Museo Jorge Rando en la capital
Sur deutsche Museum Rando wird im Pimpi vorgestell
Sur deutsche Museum Jorge Rando veranstaltet einen Käthe-Kollwitz-Monat
Sur deutsche Käthe Kollwitz wect die Neugier der Malagueños
Sur deutsche Museum Rando veranstaltet Musik-Samstage
laopiniondemálaga.es Mandarino político
20minutos.es La Cátedra Unesco de Comunicación organiza en la capital un ciclo de debates sobre la actualidad de España
euromundoglobal.com "Horizontes Verticales", exposición en el Museum Jorge Rando de Málaga
asociacionesenred.com Por primera vez una universidad y un museo colaboran internacionalmente
infomalaga.com Exposición "Horizontes Verticales'´ Museum Jorge Rando
diariosur.es Desaprendizajes
eleconomista.es La relación de Jorge Rando con la naturaleza protagoniza una nueva muestra temporal en su museo
europapress.es Foro FITUR en Museum Jorge Rando 
costanachrichten.com Kunst voller Emotionen
infoenpunto.com Dibujos de Käthe Kollwitz en la primera exposición temporal de la Fundación Rando de Málaga
malakao.es Begegnung. Encuentro Käthe Kollwitz – Jorge Rando
laopiniondemálaga.es Un diálogo de autores en el Museo Rando
surinenglish.com Culture seekers in Malaga
diocesismalaga.es Visitas que sorprenden en el Museo Jorge Rando
noticias21.es Una revista alemana ensalza Málaga e insta a visitar el Museo Jorge Rando
malagafilmoffice.com El Museum Jorge Rando, nueva localización para rodar en Málaga
alhaurin.com La Sala de estar del Arte en Málaga
slideshare.net Ayuntamiento y Fundación Jorge Rando recuperan el edificio anexo al Convento de las Mercedarias que abre como museo y revitaliza el barrio de la Goleta
lamiradaactual.blogspot.com Ayuntamiento y Fundación Jorge Rando recuperan el edificio anexo al Convento de las Mercedarias que abre como museo y revitaliza el barrio de la Goleta
elconfidencial.com Jorge Rando abre su museo como "sala de estar" consagrada al expressionismo
ideal.es Jorge Rando abre su museo como "sala de estar" consagrada al expressionismo
elmundo.es Itinerarios por el expressionismo y las pasiones del pintor Jorge Rando
diariosur.es El Museo Jorge Rando entra en capilla

Modern art museums in Spain
Contemporary art galleries in Spain
Art galleries established in 2015